The following is a list of American companies that produced, or currently produce clocks.  Where known, the location of the company and the dates of clock manufacture follow the name.

Samuel Abbott; Montpelier, Vermont (1830–1861)
Ansonia Clock Company; Ansonia, Connecticut and Brooklyn, New York (1851–1929)
Attleboro Clock Company; Attleboro, Massachusetts (1890–1915)
Bailey Banks & Biddle; Philadelphia, Pennsylvania (1832–1846)
Birge, Gilbert & Co; Bristol, Connecticut (1835)
Birge, Mallory & Co; Bristol, Connecticut (1837–1843)
Birge, Peck & Co; Bristol, Connecticut (1830)
Boardman & Dunbar; Bristol, Connecticut (1811)
Boardman & Wells; Bristol, Connecticut (1832–1843)
Brewster & Ingrahams; Bristol, Connecticut (1843–1852)
Bridgeport Clock Company (? - 1853)
Chauncey Boardman; Bristol, Connecticut (1813–1823)
Chauncey Jerome; Bristol, Connecticut (1816–1853)
Chelsea Clock Company; Boston, Massachusetts (1887–Present)
Chicago Clock Manufacturing Company; Chicago, Illinois (ca. 1860–?)
Colonial of Zeeland Clock Company; Zeeland, Michigan (1899–1986)
David Wood; Newburyport, Massachusetts (1766–1824)
Dyer, Wadsworth & Company; Augusta, Georgia (1838–1843)
E. Howard & Co.; Boston, Massachusetts (1842–Present)
E & A Ingrahams; Bristol, Connecticut (1852–1856)
Elgin Watch Company; Illinois (1864-1968)
Elias Ingraham; Bristol, Connecticut (1831–1841)
Elias Ingraham & Company; Bristol, Connecticut (1857–1860)
E Ingraham Company; Bristol, Connecticut (1884–1958)
Eli Terry; Northbury, Connecticut (1795–1852)
E N Welch Company; Bristol, Connecticut (1864–1903)
F Kroeber; New York, New York (1870–1887)
F Kroeber Clock Company; New York, New York  (1887–1904)
Franklin Clock Company; Philadelphia, Pa (1931-1962)
General Electric
General Time; Stamford, Connecticut (1930–2001)
H.C. Thompson Clock Company; Bristol, Connecticut (1903-?)
Harris & Mallow, Lakewood, NJ
Heman Clark; Plymouth Hollow, Connecticut (1783–1813)
Heman Clark; Salem Bridge, Connecticut (1738–1838)
Herschede Clock Company; Cincinnati, Ohio and Starkville, Mississippi (1885-1984)
Hotchkiss and Benedict; Auburn, New York  (ca. 1835)
Howard Miller Clock Company;  Zeeland, Michigan (1926–Present)
Ingraham Company; Bristol, Connecticut (1958–1967)
Jennings Brothers Manufacturing Corporation  Bridgeport, Connecticut  (? - ?)
Joyce Bros. & Co.; Boston, Massachusetts, Providence, Rhode Island, and Portland, Maine  (? - ?)
Lawson Clock Company, Los Angeles, California
Luman Watson; Cincinnati, Ohio (1809–1834)
Masterclock Inc.; St. Charles, MO (1994-Present)
Munger and Benedict; Auburn, New York (ca. 1825)
National Time and Signal; Wixom, Michigan (1877–Present)(Introduces the world's first pneumatically controlled master clock system.)
New England Clock Company; New Haven, Connecticut (1959–2000)
New Haven Clock Company; New Haven, Connecticut (1853–1959)
Parker & Whipple; Meriden, Connecticut (1795–1868)
Parker & Whipple Manufacturing Company; Meriden, Connecticut (1868–1893)
Parker Clock Company; Meriden, Connecticut (1893–1934)
Pomeroy, Noah; Bristol, Connecticut (1847-1878)
Ray and Ingraham;  Bristol, Connecticut  (1841–1844)
Reeves & Company; (1820 - ?)
Ridgeway Clocks; Ridgeway, Virginia
Riley Whiting; Winchester, Connecticut and Winstead, Connecticut (1808–1835)
Samuel Whiting; Concord, Massachusetts (1808–1817)
Salem Clock Company; Hartford, Connecticut
Sangamo Electric Company; Springfield, Illinois (1899–1931)
Self Winding Clock Company; New York City, New York (1886-1970)
Sempire Clock Company; St.Louis, Missouri (1897-1908)
Seth Thomas Clock Company (1807–Present)
Sessions Clock Company; Bristol, Connecticut (1903–1969)
Standard Electric Time Company; Waterbury, Connecticut, Springfield, Massachusetts, and Tecumseh, Michigan  (1887–Present)
Time Telegraph Company (1883–1887)
United Clock Company; Peru, Illinois (1853–1887)
Waltham Aircraft Clock Corporation; since 1994 in Ozark, Alabama, continuation of Waltham Precision Instruments Company
Warren Clock Company, Ashland, Massachusetts; 1912-1946
Waterbury Clock Company; Waterbury, Connecticut (1857–1967)
Western Clock Company or Westclox; (1885–2001)
William L Gilbert; Winsted, Connecticut  (1841–1871)
William L Gilbert Clock Company; Winsted, Connecticut  (1871–1934)
William L. Gilbert Clock Corporation; Winstead, Connecticut  (1934–1964)
Williams, Orton & Preston; Farmington, Connecticut (1830–1840)
Wood Art for Living; Severn, Maryland (2009-Present)
Weursch; Fall River, Massachusetts (1961-1995)

See also
List of clock manufacturers

Clock companies, list of United States